Fodé Sylla (born 23 January 1963 in Thiès, Senegal) is a French politician who was a Member of the European Parliament (MEP) for France from 1999 to 2004.

Early life 
He spent his youth in Sablé-sur-Sarthe, a French rural commune, the first one inside metropolitan France that ever had a Black mayor, Raphaël Élizé, in 1929–1940. He has a BA in History and a M.A in Political Science and wrote several books, e.g. Qui a peur de Malcom X ? (Who is afraid of Malcolm X ?) and Préférence nationale : un Apartheid à la française (National preference, a French apartheid).

SOS Racism 
He was the second president of the French anti-racist organisation SOS Racisme between 1992 and 1999.

Political career 
Although close to the French Socialist Party as a president of its near-affiliated organisation SOS Racism, he was selected as a non-party candidate by the French Communist Party for the 1999 European Elections. After his mandate, in 2006, he joined the center-left Radical Party of the Left under which label he unsuccessfully candidated for the 2007 legislative elections.

References 

 

1963 births
Living people
People from Thiès
French people of Senegalese descent
Senegalese emigrants to France
French Communist Party MEPs
MEPs for France 1999–2004
Black French politicians